Pseudorhaphitoma tetragona is a small sea snail, a marine gastropod mollusk in the family Mangeliidae.

Description
The length of the shell attains 5 mm.

Distribution
This marine genus occurs in the South China Sea and the East China Sea.

References

 Gould, A. A. Descriptions of shells collected in the North Pacific Exploring Expedition1860. under Captains Ringgold and Rodgers. Proc. Boston Soc. Nat. Hist. 1859-1860 vol.7 p. 339 pl. 21 # 9

External links
 
 

tetragona
Gastropods described in 1861